Midwesterners: The Hits is the first greatest hits album of songs composed by American rock band Hawthorne Heights. It was released on November 9, 2010 through Victory Records, without contribution from the band. The compilation is Victory's last release of material by Hawthorne Heights, and contains 16 of the band's favorite and most notable tracks that have already been released through their past albums with the record label.

Hawthorne Heights' most recent studio album, Skeletons, was released through their new label, Wind-up Records.

There is a notable typographical error on the back cover of the jewel casing where they have misspelled the word "Angels" as "Angles". It is not known how many copies of this release have the typographical error or if it will even be reissued with the typographical error corrected in the future.

Track list

Personnel
JT Woodruff – Lead vocals, piano, rhythm guitar
Micah Carli – Lead guitar
Matt Ridenour – Bass, backing vocals
Eron Bucciarelli – Drums, percussion
Casey Calvert – Rhythm guitar, death growls (excluding tracks from Fragile Future)
Grace Carli – Backing vocals (for the track "The Transition")

References

Hawthorne Heights albums
Victory Records compilation albums
2010 greatest hits albums